The 2019 International Challenger Baotou was a professional tennis tournament played on clay courts. It was the first edition of the tournament which was part of the 2019 ATP Challenger Tour. It took place in Baotou, China between 26 August and 1 September 2019.

Singles main-draw entrants

Seeds

 1 Rankings are as of 19 August 2019.

Other entrants
The following players received wildcards into the singles main draw:
  Hua Runhao
  Liu Hanyi
  Wang Chuhan
  Wang Chukang
  Wang Huixin

The following players received entry into the singles main draw as alternates:
  Chung Hong
  John Paul Fruttero

Champions

Singles

 James Duckworth def.  Sasikumar Mukund 6–4, 6–3.

Doubles

 Nam Ji-sung /  Song Min-kyu def.  Teymuraz Gabashvili /  Sasikumar Mukund 7–6(7–3), 6–2.

References

2019 ATP Challenger Tour
2019 in Chinese sport
August 2019 sports events in China
September 2019 sports events in China